Austromusotima is a genus of moths of the family Crambidae.

Species
Austromusotima camptozonale (Hampson, 1897)
Austromusotima metastictalis (Hampson, 1917)

References

Musotiminae
Crambidae genera